Fowles is the surname of the following people:

 Colin Fowles (1953−1985), Jamaican-American soccer player
 Glenys Fowles (born 1941 or 1946), Australian operatic soprano
 Ian Fowles (born 1979), American guitarist
 John Fowles (1926-2005), English writer
 Sylvia Fowles (born 1985), American basketball player